The title Virgin (Latin Virgo, Greek ) is an honorific bestowed on female saints and blesseds in some Christian traditions, including the Eastern Orthodox Church and the Catholic Church.

Chastity is one of the seven virtues in Christian tradition, listed by Pope Gregory I at the end of the 6th century. In 1 Corinthians, Saint Paul suggests a special role for virgins or unmarried women as more suitable for  "the things of the Lord".
In 2 Corinthians 11:2, Paul alludes to the metaphor of the Church as Bride of Christ by addressing the congregation "I have espoused you to one husband, that I may present you as a chaste virgin to Christ".

In the theology of the Church Fathers, the prototype of the sacred virgin is Mary, the mother of Jesus, consecrated by the Holy Spirit at the Annunciation.
Although not stated in the gospels, the perpetual virginity of Mary was widely upheld as a dogma by the Church Fathers from the 4th century.

Virgin martyrs

In the hagiography of Christian martyrs of the late 1st to early 4th centuries, virgin martyrs (Latin  (Greek , Russian ) were often persecuted for their refusal to enter a worldly marriage after having vowed to keep their virginity for the sake of heaven. Other virgin martyrs lost their lives in defensum castitatis ("in defense of chastity"). A group of virgin martyrs of the early church, namely Saints Catherine of Alexandria, Margaret of Antioch, Barbara of Nicomedia and Dorothea of Caesarea, is called "the four capital virgins", three of them belong to the Fourteen Holy Helpers.

In the Roman Missal and the Book of Hours, virgins and virgin martyrs have their own common. Different martyrologies (for example the Martyrologium Romanum or the Martyrologium Hieronymianum) list early virgin martyrs, some of which are also named in the Canon of the Mass.

Thecla of Iconium (1st century)
Sandukht of Armenia (1st century)
Felicula and Petronilla of Rome (d. c. 90)
Serapia of Antioch (c. 119)
Balbina of Rome (c. 130)
Quiteria of Aquitaine (d. 135)
Wilgefortis of Lusitany (d. 139)
Marina of Aguas Santas (d. 139)
Cecilia of Rome (2nd c.)
Pudentiana of Rome (2nd c.)
Faith, Hope and Charity of Rome (2nd c.)
Melitina of Marcianopolis (2nd century)
Venera of Rome (d. 143)
Praxedes of Rome (d. 165)
Glyceria of Heraclea (d. 177)
Blandina of Lugdunum (d. 177)
Agatha of Sicily (early 3rd c.)
Gundenis of Carthage (early 3rd c.)
Paraskevi of Iconium (3rd c.)
Estelle of Gaul (3rd c.)
Reparata of Caesarea (3rd c.)
Firmina of Rome (3rd c.)
Amonaria of Alexandria (3rd c.)
Martina of Rome (d. 228)
Tatiana of Rome (d. 226 or 235)
Euthalia of Sicily (3rd c.)
Albina of Caesarea (250 AD)
Fusca of Ravenna (250 AD)
Anastasia of Rome (250 AD)
Regina of Autun (c. 231 – c. 251 AD)
Rufina and Secunda of Rome (257 AD)
Maxima, Donatilla and Secunda of Tuburga (257 AD)
Eugenia of Rome (258 AD)
Barbara of Nicomedia (3rd c.)
Denise of Lampsacus (3rd c.)
Christina of Bolsena (3rd c.)
Vibiana (3rd c.)
Apollonia of Alexandria (d. 249)
Messalina of Foligno (d. 251)
Digna and Emerita of Rome (d. 259)
Agrippina of Mineo (d. 262)
Columba of Sens (d. 273)
Pelagia of Antioch (late 3rd c.)
Daria of Rome (283 AD)
Justa and Rufina of Seville (d. 287)
Margaret of Antioch (d. 289)
Theodosia of Tyre (d. 290)
Hripsime of Armenia (d. 290)
 Demiana and the 40 Virgins
Menodora, Metrodora, and Nymphodora
Pelagia of Tarsus
Faith of Conques
Kyriaki of Nicomedia (d. 289)
Aquilina of Byblos (d. 293)
Susanna of Rome (d. 295)
Eulalia of Barcelona (d. 303)
Engratia of Zaragoza (d. 303)
Euphemia of Chalcedon (d. 303)
Devota of Corsica (d. 303)
Rais of Tamman (d. 303)
Marciana of Mauretania (d. 303)
Agnes of Rome (d. 304)
Emerentiana of Rome (d. 304)
Anastasia of Sirmium (d. 304)
Charitina of Amisus (d. 304)
Febronia of Nisibis (d. 304)
Justina of Padua (d. 304)
Lucia of Syracuse (d. 304)
Agape, Chionia, and Irene of Thessalonica (d. 304)
Philomena of Rome (d. 304)
Eulalia of Mérida (d. 304)
Juliana of Nicomedia (d. 304)
Afra of Augsburg (d. 304)
Victoria of Albitina (d. 304)
Trofimena of Sicily (d. 304)
Theodora of Alexandria (d. 304)
Justina of Antioch (d. 304)
Anysia of Salonika (d. 304)
Crispina of Numidia (d. 304)
Leocadia of Toledo (d. 304)
Victoria of Córdoba (d. 304)
Catherine of Alexandria (d. 305)
Vasilissa of Nicomedia (d. 309)
Berenice and Prosdoce of Syria (d. 310)
Dorothea of Caesarea (d. 311)
Fausta of Cyzicus (d. 311)
Antonina of Constantinople (d. 313)
Bibiana of Rome (d. 361/3)
Ursula of Cologne and Companions, such as Leticia, Cordula,… (d. 384; various other traditional dates)
Noyale of Brittany (5th century)
Ia of Cornwall (5th century)
Augusta of Treviso (5th century)
Julia of Corsica (d. 439)
Olivia of Palermo (d. 448)
Eluned of Brecon (d. 468)
Juthwara (6th century)
Nympha of Palermo (6th century)
Columba of Cornwall (6th century)
Christina of Persia (6th century)
Dymphna of Geel (7th century)
Alena of Brussels (d. 640)
Irene of Tomar (c. 653)
Winifred of Treffynnon (d. c. 660)
Theodosia of Constantinople (d. 729)
Sidwell of Devon (c. 740)
Febronia of Syria (d. 749)
Columba of Córdoba  (d. 853)
Belina of Troyes (d. 1153), canonized in 1203
Margaret of Louvain (d. 1225)
Markella of Chios (14th century)
Joan of Arc (d. 1431), canonized in 1920
Irene of Lesbos (d. 1463)
Helen of Sinope (1700s)
Kyranna of Thessaloniki (d. 1751)
Maria Goretti (1890–1902), canonized in 1950
Edith Stein (1942), canonized in 1998 
Laura del Carmen Vicuña Pino, beatified in 1988
Karolina Kózka (1914), beatified in 1987 
Albertina Berkenbrock (1931, beatified in 2007
Antonia Mesina (1935), beatified in 1987
Nina Kuznetsova (Нина Кузнецова) martyr of Vologda (1938), canonized in the Russian Orthodox Church
Benigna Cardoso da Silva (1941), beatified in 2020 
Maria Restituta Kafka (1943), beatified in 1998
Anna Kolesárová (1944), beatified in 2018
Pierina Morosini (1957), beatified in 1987
Veronica Antal (1958), beatified in 2018
Marie-Clémentine Anuarite Nengapeta (1964), beatified in 1985
Isabel Cristina Mrad Campos (1982), beatified in 2022
Lindalva Justo de Oliveira (1993), beatified in 2007

Consecrated virgins

The tradition of the rite of the Consecratio virginum (consecration of a virgin) dates back to the 4th century, the form of life to apostolic times. The first known formal consecration is that of Saint Marcellina, dated AD 353, mentioned in De Virginibus by her brother, Saint Ambrose. Another early consecrated virgin is Saint Genevieve (c. 422 – c. 512).

According to Raymond of Capua, Saint Catherine of Siena (c. 1347–1380) at the age of twenty-one (c. 1368) experienced what she described in her letters as a Mystical marriage with Jesus Christ, later a popular subject in art as the Mystic marriage of Saint Catherine.

Canon 922 of the Catechism of the Catholic Church states that "From apostolic times Christian virgins, called by the Lord to cling only to him with greater freedom of heart, body, and spirit, have decided with the Church's approval to live in a state of virginity 'for the sake of the Kingdom of heaven'."

Virgins are consecrated for the church as a bride of Christ both in the Orthodox churches and the Roman Catholic church. While in the latter one the consecration has been bestowed for centuries only for nuns living in cloistered monasteries, the bestowal for women living in the world has been reintroduced under Pope Paul VI in 1970.  The number of consecrated virgins ranges in the thousands. Estimates derived from the diocesan records range at around 5,000 consecrated virgins worldwide as of 2018.

See also
 List of Eastern Orthodox saint titles
 Parable of the Ten Virgins

References

Karen A. Winstead, Chaste Passions: Medieval English Virgin Martyr Legends, Cornell University Press (2000).

Types of saints
Religious titles